The First Beel cabinet was the executive branch of the Dutch Government from 3 July 1946 until 7 August 1948. The cabinet was formed by the christian-democratic Catholic People's Party (KVP) and the social-democratic Labour Party (PvdA) after the election of 1946. The cabinet was a centrist grand coalition and had a substantial majority in the House of Representatives with prominent Catholic politician Louis Beel serving as Prime Minister and dual served as Minister of the Interior continuing from the previous cabinet. Labour Leader Willem Drees continued as Deputy Prime Minister and Minister of Social Affairs from the previous cabinet. According to one study, “Beel was of the opinion that a joint KVP-PvdA program should be presented to other political groups. According to Beel, that program should be socio-economically progressive, that is to say reform-oriented in favor of broad layers of the population. The socialists should not have to fear that a conservative wing within the KVP would rule the roost.”

The cabinet served during early years of the post-war 1940s. Domestically the beginning of the recovery and rebuilding following World War II continued with the Marshall Plan, it was also to implement several major social reforms to social security. Internationally the beginning of the decolonization of the Dutch East Indies was continued. The cabinet suffered no major internal and external conflicts. Following a major revision of the constitution a snap election was called to simultaneously elect a new parliament. Following the election the cabinet continued in a demissionary capacity until it was replaced with the Drees–Van Schaik cabinet.

Term
A major issue was the independence of the Dutch East Indies. This required a change in the constitution. In November 1946 the Linggadjati Agreement was signed, but different interpretations led to Dutch military intervention (politionele acties). Under international pressure through the UN, this ended and negotiations restarted, ultimately resulting in the new country Indonesia, but only under the next cabinet, Drees I. 
An important new law was the 'Noodwet Ouderdomsvoorziening' by Deputy Prime Minister and Minister of Social Affairs Willem Drees.

Cabinet Members

Trivia
 Six cabinet members had previous experience as scholars or professors: Louis Beel (Administrative Law), Piet Lieftinck (Financial and Business Economics), Jan van den Brink (Public Economics and Economical Statistics), Jos Gielen (Philology and Education Sociology), Johan Ringers (Hydraulic and Structural Engineering) and Joris in 't Veld (Public Administration).

References

External links
Official

  Kabinet-Beel I Parlement & Politiek
  Kabinet-Beel I Rijksoverheid

Cabinets of the Netherlands
1946 establishments in the Netherlands
1948 disestablishments in the Netherlands
Cabinets established in 1946
Cabinets disestablished in 1948
Grand coalition governments